Bostock Hall is a country house to the northeast of Winsford, Cheshire, England.  A former Georgian house, it was rebuilt in 1775 for Edward Tomkinson.  It is thought that the architect was Samuel Wyatt.  Alterations and additions were made to it in the middle of the 19th century and in 1875.  The house is constructed in brick with ashlar dressings; it has a slate roof.  It is in three storeys plus a basement.  Its plan is L-shaped.  The entrance front has a central bow window rising through all floors, and a single-storey porch with a balustraded parapet.  The garden front has two bows, between which are a Venetian window with a Diocletian window above.  The house is recorded in the National Heritage List for England as a designated Grade II* listed building.

See also

Grade II* listed buildings in Cheshire West and Chester
Listed buildings in Bostock

References

Further reading

Country houses in Cheshire
Houses completed in 1775
Grade II* listed buildings in Cheshire
Grade II* listed houses